Nationality words link to articles with information on the nation's poetry or literature (for instance, Irish or France).

Events

Works published
 Nicholas Billingsley, Kosmobrephia; or, The Infancy of the World, mostly poetry
 Richard Brathwaite, The Honest Ghost; or, A Voice from the Vault, published anonymously, mostly poetry
 Sir Aston Cockayne, Small Poems of Divers Sorts (see also Poems 1662)
 Henry Lawes, Ayres, and Dialogues, for One, Two, and Three Voyces, verse and music (see also Ayres and Dialogues 1653, The Second Book of Ayres and Dialogues 1655)
 Georg Stiernhielm, Hercules, the first hexametrical poem in Swedish
 Edmund Waller and Sidney Godolphin, translators, The Passion of Dido for Aneas, translated from the Latin of Virgil's Aeneid

Births
Death years link to the corresponding "[year] in poetry" article:
 Charles Mordaunt, 3rd Earl of Peterborough (died 1735), English

Deaths
Birth years link to the corresponding "[year] in poetry" article:
 Gabriel Bocángel (born 1603), Spanish playwright and poet
 John Cleveland (born 1613), English
 Georg Philipp Harsdorffer (born 1607), German poet and translator
 Benjamin Rudyerd (born 1572), English politician and poet
 Ivan Bunić Vučić (born 1591), Ragusan, Croatian-language poet

See also

 Poetry
 17th century in poetry
 17th century in literature

Notes

17th-century poetry
Poetry